Douglas S. Duckworth (born 1971) is an American academic working in the field of Buddhist philosophy and Tibetan Buddhism.

Career

Douglas Duckworth currently holds a position at Temple University in the Department of Religion and has previously taught at Kathmandu University.

Research interests
Mipam and his school.

Publications

References

External links
 

1971 births
Living people
Temple University faculty
Tibetologists
University of Virginia alumni